The Frauenberg is a hill in Hesse, Germany. It is situated south of Marburg.

References

Hills of Hesse